The gilded tube-nosed bat (Murina rozendaali) is a species of vesper bat in the family Vespertilionidae.

Distribution
This species is native to South-East Asia. In particular, it inhabits Borneo and minor pockets of Peninsula Malaysia and southern Sumatra. It has been recorded from the far south of Thailand, near the border with Malaysia, but it is unknown whether this population remains extant.

References

External links
 

Murininae
Taxonomy articles created by Polbot
Bats of Southeast Asia
Mammals described in 1984
Taxa named by John Edwards Hill